Nicias (Νικίας Nikias; c. 470–413 BC) was an Athenian politician and general during the period of the Peloponnesian War. Nicias was a member of the Athenian aristocracy and had inherited a large fortune from his father, which was invested in the silver mines around Attica's Mt. Laurium. Following the death of Pericles in 429 BC, he became the principal rival of Cleon and the democrats in the struggle for the political leadership of the Athenian state. He was a moderate in his political views and opposed the aggressive imperialism of the democrats. His principal aim was to conclude a peace with Sparta as soon as it could be obtained on terms favourable to Athens.

He was regularly elected to serve as strategos (general) for Athens during the Peloponnesian War. He led several expeditions which achieved little. Nevertheless, he was largely responsible for the successful negotiations which led to the Peace of Nicias in 421 BC.

Following the Peace, he objected to the ambitious plans of Alcibiades for advancing Athens' interests. Despite this, Nicias was appointed to participate in the Athenian invasion of Sicily. The Athenian siege of Syracuse was nearly successful until the arrival of the Spartan general Gylippus, who turned the situation around so that the Athenians were themselves under siege. Nicias led his forces in a desperate attempt to escape by land. However, they were cut off and he and his Athenian army were overwhelmed and defeated. His army was almost wiped out, and though Nicias was respected by Gylippus who wanted to bring him back to Sparta, Nicias was nevertheless assassinated by allies of Syracuse.

Early life
Nicias inherited from his father, Niceratus, a considerable fortune, which was invested mainly in the silver mines of Laurium. It is said that Nicias had over 1000 slaves working in the mines. Plutarch states that Nicias was also exceedingly generous with his wealth, using his money for charitable activities in Athens and funding many religious festivals.

Nicias' political rise
Nicias' rise to prominence occurred while Pericles was at the head of the Athenian government. After Pericles' death in 429 BC, Nicias became an important Athenian politician with the aristocratic (conservative) party looking to him as their leader. As such, Nicias became the rival of Cleon's popular or democratic party.

Nicias lacked the eloquence or charm to win popularity among Athenians, according to the later historian Plutarch. Instead, Nicias gained popularity through the use of his wealth. He funded and organized choruses for Athenian dramas, sporting events, public exhibitions, and new or restored statues and temples.

Plutarch specifically refers to an example of Nicias' generosity—his funding of the festival of Delos. Nicias funded the building of a bridge of boats between Delos and the Rhenean islands. The ships were decorated with garlands, gilding, and rich tapestry.  Then a richly dressed chorus walked across the boats. Nicias then provided a 10,000 drachma fund to the Delians so they would continue this event into the future, praying on his behalf. Such instructions were engraved onto a pillar.

Military activities
Nicias was Strategos in both 427 BC and 425 BC. During these years, Nicias was a very cautious general. He avoided engaging in any important military enterprise during his time as commander. According to Plutarch this was to his benefit, as Nicias was able to avoid the worst of Athens' misfortunes, both military and political.

Plutarch states that "Nicias declined all difficult and lengthy enterprises; if he took a command, he was for doing what was safe." Plutarch also noted that on the battlefield, Nicias was recognized as a fair combatant, fighting as courageously as any other soldier.

Peace of Nicias

After fighting for a decade in the Peloponnesian War, both Athens and Sparta were exhausted.

The Athenian general, Laches, with the support of Nicias, successfully moved in the Athenian Assembly in 423 BC for an armistice with Sparta to check the progress of Sparta's most effective general, Brasidas. However, the "Truce of Laches" had little impact on Brasidas and collapsed within a year. Brasidas proceeded to take Scione and Mende in the hope of reaching Athens and freeing Spartan prisoners. Athens sent reinforcements under Nicias, who recaptured Mende.

Cleon then effectively ended the truce between Athens and Sparta after he resolved to rescue the town of Amphipolis in Macedonia. However, through skilful generalship by Brasidas, the Spartans routed the Athenians at the Battle of Amphipolis. Both Brasidas and Cleon were killed in the battle, thereby removing the key members of the pro-war factions on both sides.

After the two generals who opposed peace, the Athenian Cleon and the Spartan Brasidas, were slain in battle, Nicias decided to seek peace between all the warring states. Nicias, and Pleistoanax, King of Sparta, negotiated in 421 BC the Peace of Nicias between Athens and Sparta, which brought a temporary end to the Peloponnesian War.

The essence of the Peace of Nicias was a return to the pre-war situation: most wartime gains were to be returned. Most notably, Amphipolis would be returned to Athens, and the Athenians would release the prisoners taken at Sphacteria. Temples throughout Greece would be open to worshippers from all cities, and the oracle at Delphi would regain its autonomy. Athens could continue to collect tribute from the states as it had done so since the time of Aristides, but Athens could not force them to become allies. Athens also agreed to come to Sparta's aid if the Helots revolted. All of Sparta's allies agreed to sign the peace, except for the Boeotians, Corinth, Elis, and Megara.

Nicias and Alcibiades
While the Peace was being negotiated, Alcibiades became more influential in Athens. Alcibiades opposed the Peace and argued strongly for Athens to continue its war against Sparta and its allies. His first move was convincing Argos to form an alliance.

Alcibiades first rose to prominence when he began advocating aggressive Athenian action after the signing of the Peace of Nicias. Historians Arnold W. Gomme and Raphael Sealey believe, and Thucydides reports, that Alcibiades was offended that the Spartans had negotiated that treaty through Nicias and Laches, overlooking him on account of his youth.

Disputes over the interpretation of the treaty led the Spartans to dispatch ambassadors to Athens with full powers to arrange all unsettled matters. The Athenians initially received these ambassadors well, but Alcibiades met with them in secret before they were to speak to the ecclesia (the Athenian Assembly) and told them that the Assembly was haughty and had great ambitions. He urged them to renounce their diplomatic authority to represent Sparta, and instead allow him to assist them through his influence in Athenian politics. The representatives agreed and, impressed with Alcibiades, they distanced themselves from Nicias, despite him being sincere in wanting to reach an agreement with the Spartans. The next day, during the Assembly, Alcibiades asked them what powers Sparta had granted them to negotiate and they replied, as agreed, that they had not come with full and independent powers. This was in direct contradiction to what they had said the day before, and Alcibiades seized on this opportunity to denounce their character, cast suspicion on their aims, and destroy their credibility. This ploy increased Alcibiades' standing while embarrassing Nicias, and Alcibiades was subsequently appointed General. He took advantage of his increasing power to orchestrate the creation of an alliance between Argos, Mantinea, Elis, and other states in the Peloponnese, threatening Sparta's dominance in the region. This alliance, however, was ultimately defeated in 418 BC at the Battle of Mantinea.

Nicias and Hyperbolos
During the years 416 BC and 415 BC, a complex struggle took place between Hyperbolos on one side and Nicias and Alcibiades on the other. Hyperbolos tried to bring about the ostracism of one of this pair, but Nicias and Alcibiades combined their influence to induce the people to expel Hyperbolos instead. This incident reveals that Nicias and Alcibiades each commanded a personal following, whose votes were determined by the wishes of the leaders.

Plutarch was of the view that the Athenians were so angered by this cynical manoeuvring that the ostracism was never to be used again.

The Sicilian Expedition

In 415 BC, delegates from the Sicilian city of Segesta arrived in Athens to plead for the support of the Athenians in their war against Selinus. During the subsequent debates, Nicias vehemently opposed an Athenian intervention, using the argument that the campaign would be excessively costly if it was to be successful. He attacked the character and motives of Alcibiades, who was a strong supporter of the expedition. Alcibiades argued that a Sicilian campaign would bring riches to the city and expand the empire, just as the Persian Wars had.

In spite of Alcibiades' enthusiastic advocacy for the plan, it was Nicias, not he, who turned a modest undertaking into a massive campaign and made the conquest of Sicily seem possible and safe. It was at Nicias’ suggestion that the size of the fleet was significantly increased from 60 ships to "140 triremes, 5,100 hoplites, and about 1,300 archers, slingers, and light armed men". It would seem that Nicias' intention was to shock the assembly with his high estimate of the forces required, but, instead of dissuading his fellow citizens, his analysis made them all the more eager.

Against his wishes Nicias was appointed General along with Alcibiades and Lamachus, all three of whom were given full powers to do whatever was in the best interests of Athens while in Sicily.

One night during preparations for the expedition, the hermai, heads of the god Hermes on a plinth with a phallus, were mutilated throughout Athens. This was a religious scandal and was seen as a bad omen for the mission. Plutarch explains that Androcles, a political leader, used false witnesses who accused Alcibiades and his friends of mutilating the statues, and of profaning the Eleusinian Mysteries. Later his opponents, chief among them being Androcles and Thessalus, Cimon's son, enlisted orators to argue that Alcibiades should set sail as planned and stand trial on his return from the campaign. Alcibiades was suspicious of their intentions, and asked to be allowed to stand trial immediately, under penalty of death, in order to clear his name. This request was denied, and in 415 BC the fleet set sail, with the charges unresolved.

Arriving to Catana, Sicily, the three commanders had differing plans for attacking Syracuse. While there, an Athenian ship arrived to inform Alcibiades that he was under arrest, not only for the destruction of the hermai, but also for supposedly profaning the Eleusinian Mysteries. Alcibiades agreed to return in his ship, but when the ship stopped in southern Italy at Thurii, he escaped and sailed to the Peloponnese, where he eventually sought refuge in Sparta. He soon began offering advice to the Spartans on how the situation in Syracuse could be made to benefit them at Athens' expense. In Athens a death sentence was passed in absentia, his guilt seemingly proven.

Led by Nicias the Athenian forces landed at Dascon near Syracuse but with little result. Hermocrates led the Syracusan defence. Meanwhile, Alcibiades persuaded the Spartans to send Gylippus to assist Syracuse. As a result, a Spartan fleet soon arrived to reinforce their allies in Syracuse and a stalemate ensued.

Athens responded to appeals from Nicias by sending out in 414 BC 73 vessels and 5,000 soldiers to Sicily under the command of Athenian generals, Demosthenes and Eurymedon, to assist Nicias and his forces with the siege of Syracuse.

The Athenian army moved to capture Syracuse while the larger fleet of Athenian ships blocked the approach to the city from the sea. After some initial success, the Athenian troops became disorganised in the chaotic night operation and were thoroughly routed by Gylippus. The Athenian commanders Lamachus and Eurymedon were killed. Nicias, although ill, was left in sole charge of the siege of Syracuse.

Following this defeat in battle, Demosthenes suggested that the Athenians immediately give up the siege of Syracuse and return to Athens, where they were needed to defend against an Alcibiades’ inspired Spartan invasion of Attica. Nicias refused. According to Plutarch, Nicias explained that he preferred to be killed by the enemy, rather than being killed by the Athenians, who would condemn him if they were defeated.

Death
However, during 413 BC, the Syracusans and Spartans under Hermocrates were able to trap the Athenians in the harbour and the Athenians sustained heavy losses in the second Battle of Syracuse. Demosthenes was ambushed by the Syracusans and was forced to surrender. Nicias was soon captured as well, and both were executed by allied forces despite Gylippus’ orders to the contrary. Most of the surviving Athenian soldiers were kept in the stone quarries near Syracuse (as there was no other room for them) where many died slowly of disease and starvation. Few survivors returned to Athens.

Notes

References

 
 Besides Thucydides see Plutarch's Nicias and Diod. xii. 83; also the general authorities on the history of Greece.
 Nicias appears as a character in Plato's dialogue Laches, in which Socrates and others discuss the nature of courage without reaching any firm conclusions.
 Nicias' silver mines are described by Xenophon, in both "On Revenues" and "The memorable thoughts of Socrates".

External links
 Livius, Nicias by Jona Lendering
https://www.academia.edu/38573412/The_risk_of_open_voting._Army_assembly_and_fake_news_at_the_end_of_the_Sicilian_Expedition

470s BC births
413 BC deaths
5th-century BC Athenians
Ancient Athenian generals
Athenians of the Peloponnesian War